René Oreel (19 September 1922 – 2 January 2010) was a Belgian racing cyclist. He rode in the 1947 Tour de France.

References

External links

1922 births
2010 deaths
Belgian male cyclists
Sportspeople from West Flanders
Sportspeople from Bruges
Cyclists from West Flanders
20th-century Belgian people